Sabha ( Sabhā) is one of the districts of Libya. It is located near the center of the country, in the Fezzan region. The capital is the city of Sabha. Sabha District borders the following districts, namely, Wadi Al Shatii in the north, Al Jufrah in the east, Murzuq in the south and Wadi Al Hayaa in the west.

Per the census of 2012, the total population in the region was 157,747. The average size of the household in the country was 6.9. There were totally 22,713 households in the district, with 20,907 Libyan ones.  The population density of the district was 1.86 persons per sq. km.

Geography 

Sabha District borders the following districts, namely, Wadi Al Shatii in north, Al Jufrah in east, Murzuq in south and Wadi Al Hayaa in the west. Sabha District is in the Fezzen region (Libyan Desert), a section of the Sahara Desert. The Sabha Air Base is in the district. The Gaberoun oasis, on a spring fed lake, is a popular tourist attraction in the district. Around 91 per cent of the land is covered by desert, with only 8.8 per cent agricultural land (with only 1% arable lands) and 0.1 per cent of forests. The climate is desert in most parts of the district. Dust storms lasting four to eight days is pretty common during Spring. Triplotania is the northwest region, while it is Cyrenacia in the east and Fezzen in southwest. Fezzen is mostly full of deserts. There are no perennial rivers in the region, but the region is abundant with groundwater aquifers.

Demographics 
Per the census of 2012, the total population in the region was 157,747 with 150,353 Libyans. The average size of the household in the country was 6.9, while the average household size of non-Libyans being 3.7. There were totally 22,713 households in the district, with 20,907 Libyan ones.  The population density of the district was 1.86 persons per sq. km. Per 2006 census, there were totally 43,010 economically active people in the district. There were 18,172 government employees, 5,114 employers, 16,974 first level workers and 001-second level workers. There were 8,114 workers in state administration, 6,733 in agriculture, animal husbandry and forestry, 7,341 in agriculture & hunting, 7,931 in education, 3,840 in private enterprises, 1,340 in health & social work, 2,277 in production, 8,395 in technical work and 905 service workers. The total enrollment in schools was 45,581 and the number of people above secondary stage and less than graduation was 2,529. As per the report from World Health Organization (WHO), there were one communicable disease centres, 12 dental clinics, one general clinics, four in-patient clinics, seven out-patient clinics, 57 pharmacies, 25 PHC centres and one polyclinic.

Politics 
The major settlements of Sabha District include Sabha, Samnu, Tamanhant, Umm al `Abid, Umm al Ahrar and Al Mahdia. Libya became independent in 1951 from the colonial empire and generally known for its oil rich resources. As a part of decentralization in 2012, the country is administratively split into 13 regions from the original 25 municipalities, which were further divided in 1,500 communes. As of 2016, there were 22 administrative divisions in the country in the form of districts. In the Libyan Civil War, Gaddafi forces maintained control of large parts of the district and city longer than elsewhere in the country. The National Transitional Council took control of the city on 11 September 2011.

References 

Districts of Libya
+